Xi Boötis, Latinised from ξ Boötis, is a binary star system located at a distance of 22 light-years away from Earth. It is the nearest visible star in the constellation Boötes. The brighter, primary component of the pair has a visual magnitude of 4.70, making it visible to the naked eye.

Properties

The primary star in this system is a BY Draconis variable with an apparent magnitude that varies from +4.52 to +4.67 with a period just over 10 days long, and is classified as a G-type main-sequence star. The magnetic activity in the star's chromosphere varies with time, but no activity cycle has yet been found. It has 88% of the mass and 82% of the radius of the Sun, but shines with just 56% the Sun's luminosity. The secondary component is a K-type star with just 66% of the Sun's mass and 61% of the Sun's radius.

The pair follow a wide, highly elliptical orbit around their common barycenter, completing an orbit every 151.5 years. Radial velocities taken of the primary as part of an extrasolar planet search show a linear trend in the velocities which is likely due to the secondary star. The pair can be resolved even through smaller telescopes. The binary system contains some of the closest young solar-type stars to the Sun, with a system age of about 200 million years old.

The primary star (A) has been identified as a candidate for possessing a Kuiper-like belt, based on infrared observations. The estimated minimum mass of this dust disk is 2.4 times the mass of the Earth's Moon. (Compare to the value of 8.2 lunar masses for the Kuiper belt.)

A necessary condition for the existence of a planet in this system are stable zones where the object can remain in orbit for long intervals. For hypothetical planets in a circular orbit around the individual members of this star system, this maximum orbital radius is computed to be  for the primary and 3.5 AU for the secondary. A planet orbiting outside of both stars would need to be at least 108 AU distant.

References

External links
 
 HR 5544
 GJ 566 B
 CCDM J14513+1906
 Image Xi Boötis

G-type main-sequence stars
K-type main-sequence stars
Bootis, Xi
BY Draconis variables
Binary stars

Boötes
Bootis, Xi
Durchmusterung objects
Bootis, 37
0566
131156
072659
5544